The men's sprint in the FIS Nordic World Ski Championships 2013 was held on 21 February 2013. The qualifying was held in the morning to determine the final participants.

Nikita Kryukov of Russia won the gold medal, while Petter Northug of Norway repeated his silver from the previous championships, and Alex Harvey of Canada claimed the bronze medal. Defending champion Marcus Hellner of Sweden did not participate in the event.

Qualification

Quarterfinals

Quarterfinal 1

Quarterfinal 2

Quarterfinal 3

Quarterfinal 4

Quarterfinal 5

Semifinals

Semifinal 1

Semifinal 2

Finals
The final races were held from 13:12 to 14:25.

References

Men's sprint